Tucson Mall is the largest shopping mall in Tucson, Arizona. Tucson Mall features over 170 stores and two levels of indoor shopping. It is anchored by Forever 21 (formerly Mervyn's), J. C. Penney, Macy's (formerly Goldwaters, Foley's and Robinsons-May), and Dillard's (formerly Diamonds). Tucson Mall contains a food court containing several fast food restaurants, as well as "Arizona Avenue," an arcade containing Southwestern-themed items. The mall is located on the north side of Tucson, bounded by Oracle Road (Arizona State Route 77), Wetmore Road, Stone Avenue, and the Rillito River.

Anchor stores
Dillard's
Forever 21 (formerly Mervyn's)
J. C. Penney
Macy's (formerly occupied in a  originally Broadway Southwest. Current location originally opened as Foley's in 1991; chain's Arizona locations rebranded as Robinsons-May February 2, 1997 changed to Macy's in 2006)
Old Navy

Former anchors
Diamond's (sold to Dillard's in 1984)
Foley's (became Robinsons-May on February 2, 1997, closed sometime shortly after the chain was bought out by Macy's, reopened as Macy's in 2006)
The Broadway (became Macy's in 1996, closed in 2006, demolished in 2007)
Mervyns (closed in 2008, became Forever 21 in 2009)
Sears (closed in April 2020)

Idea for the Tucson Mall
According to historian David Leighton, it was Helen Wetmore, whose husband's family had homesteaded the land in the late 1800s, who came up with the idea for the Tucson Mall. During a trip to Chicago in the 1930s, she spotted a shopping center on the Skokie Highway and thought to herself, "That's what I am going to have on my land." She kept the parcel of land together until 1978, and at that point plans for the mall were initiated with Forest City Enterprises.

History
The Tucson Mall opened in 1982, with about 100 stores and five department stores, including Broadway, J. C. Penney, Mervyn’s, Diamond's and Sears. Diamond's was converted to Dillard's in 1984.

Beginning in 1990, the mall began an extensive expansion project. First, the Dillard's anchor was expanded and a parking garage was added adjacent to Dillard's. On the east side of the mall, an entirely new wing was built; the original mall footprint had stopped just to the east of the center court area.  The area to the southeast of the Mervyn's had been a parking lot. A new wing opened in 1991 and added over 400,000 sq ft to the mall, over 70 new stores, and a sixth anchor, Houston-based Foley's.

In 1993, the food court was renovated with addition of a carousel and Arizona Avenue.

In 1996, the Broadway was changed to a Macy's after Federated Department Stores acquired Broadway.

In 1997, all of Foley's locations in Arizona were rebranded as the Los Angeles-based Robinsons-May.

In 2001, General Growth Properties purchased Tucson Mall.

In 2003, the aging mall underwent a $15 million overhaul, which was the first major overhaul since it opened in 1982. The mall was given all new polished tile floors, glass railings on the upper level, new escalators and elevators where stairs had been, a new children’s play area, new and refurbished restrooms, reworked food court and Arizona Avenue, changes to fountains and a new paint scheme.

In 2006, the Robinsons-May was changed to a Macy's after Macy's acquired them in a corporate purchase. The existing Macy's on the south side of the mall was vacated.

In 2007, the former Macy's store was demolished in preparation for an extensive remodel and addition on the south side of the mall. The changes include the addition of a grand entrance hall in the location of the old anchor, extension of stores on both the east and west side of the new entrance, addition of multiple water features, complete update of facade from current Macy's to Mall Security Offices, and the addition of REI and The Cheesecake Factory on the south side of the Tucson Mall. A parking structure was also added adjacent to the current Macy's.

In 2008, GameStop, formerly an Electronics Boutique, in the bottom floor was relocated to the center as a Software ETC on the top floor, also owned by Gamestop, hyped a bigger, better Gamestop, this larger center one being the result. Mervyn's closed their store with the chain's demise.

In 2009, Forever 21 opened in the approximately  space formerly anchored by Mervyn's as part of its strategy to open larger stores with a more diverse merchandise selection.

On February 6, 2020, it was announced that Sears would be closing as part of a plan to close 31 stores nationwide. The store closed in April 2020.

Transportation
Sun Tran's Tohono Tadai Transit Center, located adjacent to the Mall, was opened in 1994.

References

ErSys: Tucson, AZ - Area Malls - Shopping Experience

External links
Tucson Mall Official Site
Aerial View

Shopping malls established in 1982
Brookfield Properties
Shopping malls in Arizona
Buildings and structures in Tucson, Arizona
Economy of Tucson, Arizona
Shopping malls in Pima County, Arizona
Tourist attractions in Tucson, Arizona